This is a list of films which have placed number one at the weekend box office in the United Kingdom during 2008.

Notes

References

See also
British films of 2008
List of number-one DVDs of 2008 (UK)

2008
Box office number-one films
United Kingdom

zh:2008年全美週末票房冠軍